Macrolobium is a legume genus in the subfamily Detarioideae. It is a tropical genus with about 80 species. Half occur in Brazil, where they are common in the floodplains of the Amazonian Basin. Members of the genus are used as ornamentals and for their wood.

Species
Species accepted by the Plants of the World Online as of February 2021:

Macrolobium acaciifolium 
Macrolobium acrothamnos 
Macrolobium amplexans 
Macrolobium angustifolium 
Macrolobium anomalum 
Macrolobium aracaense 
Macrolobium archeri 
Macrolobium arenarium 
Macrolobium bifolium 
Macrolobium brevense 
Macrolobium campestre 
Macrolobium canaliculatum 
Macrolobium cataractarum 
Macrolobium cidii 
Macrolobium colombianum 
Macrolobium conjunctum 
Macrolobium costaricense 
Macrolobium cowanii 
Macrolobium defloccatum 
Macrolobium discolor 
Macrolobium dressleri 
Macrolobium duckeanum 
Macrolobium evenulosum 
Macrolobium exfoliatum 
Macrolobium extensum 
Macrolobium flexuosum 
Macrolobium floridum 
Macrolobium froesii 
Macrolobium furcatum 
Macrolobium gracile 
Macrolobium grallator 
Macrolobium guianense 
Macrolobium hartshornii 
Macrolobium herrerae 
Macrolobium huberianum 
Macrolobium inaequale 
Macrolobium ischnocalyx 
Macrolobium jenmanii 
Macrolobium klugii 
Macrolobium latifolium 
Macrolobium limbatum 
Macrolobium longeracemosum 
Macrolobium longipedicellatum 
Macrolobium longipes 
Macrolobium machaerioides 
Macrolobium microcalyx 
Macrolobium modicopetalum 
Macrolobium molle 
Macrolobium montanum 
Macrolobium multijugum 
Macrolobium obtusum 
Macrolobium palustre 
Macrolobium parvifolium 
Macrolobium pendulum 
Macrolobium pittieri 
Macrolobium prancei 
Macrolobium punctatum 
Macrolobium retusum 
Macrolobium rigidum 
Macrolobium rubrum 
Macrolobium savannarum 
Macrolobium schinifolium 
Macrolobium simira 
Macrolobium spectabile 
Macrolobium stenocladum 
Macrolobium stenopetalum 
Macrolobium stenosiphon 
Macrolobium steyermarkii 
Macrolobium suaveolens 
Macrolobium taxifolium 
Macrolobium taylorii 
Macrolobium trinitense 
Macrolobium unifoliolatum 
Macrolobium urupaense 
Macrolobium venulosum 
Macrolobium wurdackii

References

Detarioideae
Fabaceae genera
Taxonomy articles created by Polbot